Vous êtes de la police ? is a 2007 French crime comedy film directed by Romuald Beugnon.

Plot
Simon, a retired police inspector, does not appreciate being placed in a retirement home. Fortunately, he quickly becomes friends with Alfred, another resident. When Alfred dies under strange circumstances, the management, supported by the gendarmerie, declare it an accident. Simon, meanwhile, is convinced that this is a crime and he is determined to solve the mystery. With another resident, Francky, rocker and kleptomaniac rogue, he goes for an unusual police investigation.

Cast

 Jean-Pierre Cassel as Simon Sablonnet
 Philippe Nahon as Francky Garcia
 Jean-Claude Brialy as Alfred Lamproie
 Micheline Presle as Jane Latour-Jackson
 Yolande Moreau as Christine Léger
 Firmine Richard as Chantal Dumas
 Marilyne Canto as Monique Laval
 Pol Deranne as Jacques Poutrard
 Sylvianne Ramboux-Ysaye as Edwige Renard
 Thérèse Roussel as Sidonie Bervelbeck
 Catherine Belkacem as Aglaé François
 Marie-Rose Roland as Marielle Sablonnet
 Sophie Dewulf as Maeva Leloup
 Albert Blanchard as Jean-Jacques Loubin
 Anne Dethier as Sylvie Gonzales
 Mylène Gilsons as Madeleine Bouteloup

References

External links

2007 films
2000s crime comedy films
French crime comedy films
2000s French-language films
2007 directorial debut films
2007 comedy films
2000s French films